The Entebbe Cricket Oval is a cricket ground, in Entebbe, Uganda.

In August 2021, the ground was the venue for the 2021–22 Uganda Tri-Nation Series which involved Uganda's team  along with Kenya and NIgeria. The tournament was originally planned to consist of 13 T20I matches, with the sides facing each other four times in a round-robin stage, followed by a final between the top two teams. The round-robin was later reduced by three matches with each team facing each other three times.

References

External links 
 CricHQ

Cricket grounds in Uganda
Sports venues in Uganda